Mora is a town in northern Cameroon. Mora has a population of 55,216 making it the 5th biggest city in Far North.

The German fort of Mora was the last German fort in Cameroon to surrender during World War I. After a long time under siege, Captain Ernst von Raben and his men surrendered to the allied forces on February 20, 1916, over a year after the rest of the German army withdrew out of Cameroon. Many German troops escaped to the neutral Spanish colony of Río Muni.

Gallery

References 

 Damis, Fritz. Auf Dem Moraberge – Erinnerungen an Die Kämpfe Der 3. Kompagnie Der Ehemaligen Kaiserlichen Schutztruppe Für Kamerun. 1929. Berlin. German soldiers' collective account of the siege
 Dane, Edmund. British Campaigns in Africa and the Pacific, 1914-1918,. London: Hodder and Stoughton, 1919.
 Dornseif, Golf. Kameruner Endkampf Um Die Festung Moraberg. 2 June 2010. Web. 
 Farwell, Byron.The Great War in Africa. W.W. Norton & Company, Inc., New York, 1986. 
 Fecitte, Harry. Lake Chad Area: 1914. Harry's Africa – The Soldier's Burden. Web.
 Henry, Helga Bender. Cameroon on a Clear Day. Pasadena, CA: William Carey Library, 1999.
 O'Neill, Herbert C. The War in Africa and the Far East. London: London Longmans Green, 1918.
 Robinson, Dan. Publication. Mandaras Publishing, 2010. Web.
 Strachan, Hew. The First World War. Vol. I: To Arms. Oxford: Oxford University Press, 2001.
 Strachan, Hew. The First World War in Africa. Oxford: Oxford University Press. 2004 

Communes of Far North Region (Cameroon)